is a Japanese actor who has performed in Japan, Hollywood and Hong Kong. He won Best Supporting Actor and the Popular Star Award at the 37th Blue Dragon Film Awards for his performance in the South Korean horror film The Wailing, directed by Na Hong-jin.

Early life and education 
Kunimura was born Yoshihiro Yonemura (米村 喜洋 Yonemura Yoshihiro) in Yatsushiro, Kumamoto Prefecture, but his family moved to Amagasaki, Hyōgo Prefecture soon after, before moving again to Osaka when he was two years old. He graduated from a theatre program operated by the Osaka Broadcasting Corporation, a theatre company owned and operated by a local NHK affiliate. He has cited actor Yūsaku Matsuda as an influence.

Career 
Kunimura began his acting career with a bit part in Shirō Moritani's 1973 disaster film Tidal Wave. He went on to appear in the TV dramas Ayu no Uta and Yôi don, before holding his first starring role in Kazuyuki Izutsu's Gaki Teikoku. Throughout the late 80s and early 90s, he appeared in a number of Hong Kong-produced films, including a prominent cameo role in John Woo's Hard Boiled, as a Triad gunman in the film's opening teahouse shootout. In 1989, he starred in his first American film, Black Rain. The Ridley Scott-helmed Yakuza action film was shot on-location in Kunimura's hometown of Osaka, and starred his mentor Yūsaku Matsuda.

Kunimura is known internationally for his work with Western directors such as Ridley Scott, Quentin Tarantino, and Roland Emmerich. He has collaborated with prominent Japanese filmmakers like Takashi Miike, Lee Sang-il, Hideaki Anno, and Ryuhei Kitamura. In 2016, he starred in Na Hong-jin's Korean horror film The Wailing, which earned him critical and popular acclaim. It earned him the Best Supporting Actor and Popular Star Awards at the 37th Blue Dragon Film Awards, making him the first-ever non-Korean and Japanese actor to be nominated for the award.

Filmography

Film

Television

Awards and nominations

References

External links 
 

Japanese male film actors
Japanese male television actors
1955 births
Living people
Actors from Kumamoto Prefecture
20th-century Japanese male actors
21st-century Japanese male actors
People from Yatsushiro, Kumamoto